Nicholas Joseph Pitera (born March 7, 1986) is an American singer, animator and YouTuber. , Pitera worked as a 3D Modeler at Pixar Studios. Pitera sung the Triple Dent Gum jingle in Pixar's Inside Out. He was also known as the singing voice of Clarence from 2013 Clarence.

Career

Nick Pitera is a baritone. Pitera gained his popularity for his extensive vocal range and his unusual feminine falsetto, as he first demonstrated in his most popular video, a cover of "A Whole New World", from the movie Aladdin where he sang both Aladdin and Jasmine's parts.

In 2011, Pitera released "One Man Disney Movie" using a "'Brady Bunch'-style grid" to perform "an eight-minute-plus mashup of songs from various big-screen musical fairy tales, from "Beauty and the Beast" to "Enchanted," taking on the roles of the heroes, heroines, villains, sidekicks and their furry choirs."

In 2012, Pitera released a medley cover of Andrew Lloyd Webber songs entitled "One Man Phantom of the Opera."

Pitera has also appeared on The Ellen DeGeneres Show as one of the audience acts. He sang "A Whole New World" from Disney, with himself singing both Jasmine's and Aladdin's parts.

He released his first self-written original single album called "Better Days" on iTunes and Amazon on December 4, 2012. He released an EP of five original songs in 2015.

For his work on Onward, Pitera was jointly nominated in 2021 for a VES Award in the category Outstanding Created Environment in an Animated Feature.

References

Further reading

External links

Living people
1986 births
American Internet celebrities
American baritones
Countertenors
American male singers
Singers from Minnesota
People from Woodbury, Minnesota
Pixar people
21st-century American singers
American people of Italian descent
Ringling College of Art and Design alumni